East Liverpool Pottery operated in East Liverpool, Ohio from its construction in 1844 until it ceased production in 1939. The site was made up of five buildings and 2 kilns. The company's bottle kilns, their shape resembling a bottle, were used for the production of pottery ware.

The site, also known as Goodwin-Baggott-Eagle-Mountford Pottery, was added to the National Register of Historic Places on October 7, 1971.

References

Industrial buildings and structures on the National Register of Historic Places in Ohio
Buildings and structures in Columbiana County, Ohio
National Register of Historic Places in Columbiana County, Ohio